This is a list of former vessels of the Finnish Navy.

Coastal defence ships

Submarines

Icebreakers

Mine warfare

Minelayers
 Louhi
 Sveaborg
 Keihässalmi
 Pohjanmaa

minelayers
 Riilahti
 Ruotsinsalmi

minelayers
Also known as minelaying boats or T-class boats.
 Pommi
 Miina
 Lieska
 Loimu
 Paukku

minelayers
 Porkkala
 Pukkio
 Pansio

Requisitioned minelayers
 Baltic
 Frej
 Poseidon
 Suomi

Minesweepers
 Ajonpää
 Kallanpää
 Purunpää
 Vahterpää
 Tammenpää
 Katanpää

minesweepers
 Rautu
 Vilppula

minesweepers
 SM 1
 SM 2
 SM 3
 SM 4

minesweepers
 Ahven
 Kiiski
 Muikku
 Särki
 Kuore
 Lahna

minesweepers (1941) 
 Kuha
 Salakka
 Siika
 Harjus
 Säynäs
 Karppi
 Kuha 7
 Kuha 8
 Kuha 9
 Kuha 10
 Kuha 11
 Kuha 12
 Kuha 13
 Kuha 14
 Kuha 15
 Kuha 16
 Kuha 17
 Kuha 18

Kuha-class minesweepers (1974) 
 Kuha 22 (22)
 Kuha 25 (25)

Kiiski class minesweepers 
 Kiiski 2 (522)

A-class minesweepers
 A-1
 A-5

DR-class minesweepers
Former United States Army Design 257-A 74-foot tugs.
 DR-1
 DR-2
 DR-3
 DR-5
 DR-6
 DR-7
 DR-8
 DR-9
 DR-10
 DR-11
 DR-15
 DR-17
 DR-18

Gunboats
 Hämeenmaa
 Uusimaa
 Klas Horn
 Matti Kurki
 Karjala
 Turunmaa
 Aunus
 Gilyak
 Tampere
 Viena
 1

Frigates
 Hämeenmaa
 Matti Kurki
 Uusimaa

Corvettes
Karjala
Turunmaa

Patrol/ASW vessels

s
 Kiisla
 Kurki

Escort vessels
 Aura
 Aura II
 Uisko
 Tursas
 Viipuri
 762

Fast attack craft

Torpedo boats
 S1
 S2
 S3
 S4
 S5
 S6
 C1
 C2
 C3
 C4
 Minosets 214
 Minosets 218
 Minosets 220
 Minosets 222

s
 Sisu
 Hurja

s
 Isku

s
 Syöksy
 Nuoli
 Vinha
 Raju

'V class' motor torpedo boats
 Vasama
 Vihuri
 Viima
 V3

Dark-class fast patrol boat
 Vasama I
 Vasama II

Patrol boat
 Turja

s
 Hyöky
 Hirmu
 Hurja
 Hyrsky
 Häijy

s
 Jylhä
 Jyry
 Jyske
 Jymy

s
 Tarmo
 Taisto
 Tyrsky
 Tuima
 Tuisku
 Tuuli
 Taisto 7
 Taisto 8

R-class patrol boats
 Rymättylä
 Rihtniemi
 Ruissalo
 Raisio
 Röyttä

Motor patrol boats
 VMV 1
 VMV 2
 VMV 3
 VMV 4
 VMV 5
 VMV 6
 VMV 7
 VMV 8
 VMV 9
 VMV 10
 VMV 11
 VMV 12
 VMV 13
 VMV 14
 VMV 15
 VMV 16
 VMV 17
 VMV 18
 VMV 19
 VMV 20
 VMV 101
 VMV 102
 VMV 103
 VMV 104

Nuoli-class fast gunboats
 Nuoli 1
 Nuoli 2
 Nuoli 3
 Nuoli 4
 Nuoli 5
 Nuoli 6
 Nuoli 7
 Nuoli 8
 Nuoli 9
 Nuoli 10
 Nuoli 11
 Nuoli 12
 Nuoli 13

Hovercraft
 Tuuli

School ships
 Suomen Joutsen
 Matti Kurki

Connection vessels
 Augustin Ehrensvärd
 Axel von Fersen
 Fabian Wrede
 Wilhelm Carpelan
 Ahvola

Surveillance ships 
 Kustaanmiekka (99) (ex-Valvoja III)

Transport

s
 Hauki (232)
 Hankoniemi (334)

Kampela-class transports
Kampela 1 (771)
Kampela 2 (772)

Kala-class transports
 Kala 4 (874)
 Kala 5
 Kala 6 (176)

s
 Lohi (351)

s
 Valas (897)
 Vahakari (121)
 Mursu (98)

Training ships

Heikki-class training ships
H3 (683)

Lokki-class training ships
 Lokki (57)

Command launches

Askeri-class command launch 
 Viiri

Träskö-class command launch 
 Alskär (993)
 Torsö (894)

See also
List of current ships of the Finnish Navy
Finnish Navy

References

Decommissioned

Ships